Agonum harrisii is a species of beetle in the family Carabidae. It is found in Winthrop Harbor, Illinois, United States.

References

Further reading

 
 

harrisii
Beetles described in 1846
Taxa named by John Lawrence LeConte
Articles created by Qbugbot